Ennetières-en-Weppes is a commune in the Nord department in northern France. It is part of the Métropole Européenne de Lille.

Heraldry

See also
Communes of the Nord department

References

External links

Ennetieresenweppes
French Flanders